Calliphylla is a genus of moths in the family Gelechiidae. It contains the species Calliphylla retusa, which is found in South Africa.

References

Endemic moths of South Africa
Anacampsinae
Moths described in 1963